CD-202 or No. 202 was a Type D escort ship of the Imperial Japanese Navy during World War II.

History
She was laid down on 16 February 1945 at the Nagasaki shipyard of Mitsubishi Heavy Industries for the benefit of the Imperial Japanese Navy and launched on 2 April 1945. On 7 July 1945, she was completed and commissioned. On 15 August 1945, Japan announced their unconditional surrender and CD-202 traveled to Sasebo where on 17 August 1945, a steam pipe exploded killing one man. On 30 November 1945, she was struck from the Navy List. She was scrapped in 1947.

References

1945 ships
Type D escort ships
Ships built by Mitsubishi Heavy Industries